Philip Mechanicus, born April 17, 1889 in Amsterdam and died in October 1944 in the Auschwitz concentration camp, was a Dutch journalist and diarist.

Bibliography 
 Renata Laqueur: Schreiben im KZ. Tagebücher 1940–1945 Bearbeitet von Martina Dreisbach und mit einem Geleitwort von Rolf Wernstedt, Donat-Verlag, Bremen 1992, Zugl.: New York, Univ., Diss., pp. 130.
 Koert Broersma: Buigen onder de storm. Levensschets van Philip Mechanicus 1889-1944, Van Gennep, Amsterdam 1993.  2019, .

References 

Print journalists
Dutch journalists
Dutch people who died in Auschwitz concentration camp
1889 births
1944 deaths